My Best Friend, General Vasili, the Son of Joseph Stalin is a 1991 film, directed by Viktor Sadovsky and starring Boris Schcherbakov and Vladimir Steklov.

Plot
Biopic film, based on a true story of friendship between Vasili Stalin, the son of the Soviet leader Joseph Stalin, and the famous Russian sports star Vsevolod Bobrov.

Vasili Stalin was Lieut. General of the Red Army in charge of the Army and Airforce sports teams. He befriended the talented athlete Bagrov (Bobrov) and made him a sports star in the Soviet Union. After each game played by his "toy-star" Bobrov, General Vasili Stalin would throw massive and wild drinking parties, with women dancing on their dining table among bottles of vodka. But after the death of his father, general Vasili Stalin was arrested by the new Soviet leadership, and was charged with "anti-Soviet" conspiracy, because of his opinions expressed in conversations with foreign diplomats.

Cast

Main Characters
Boris Shcherbakov as Vsevolod Bagrov (Vsevolod Bobrov)
Vladimir Steklov as Vasili Josifovich Stalin
Andrei Boltnev as Astafiev
Irina Malysheva as Ninel
Andrei Tolubeyev as Tolik
Petr Shelokhonov as Colonel Savinykh
Igor Gorbachyov as Doctor
Viktoriya Sadovskaya
Valentina Kovel
Igor Yefimov
Georgi Shtil

Cameos
Yan Yanakiev, Ernst Romanov, Andrei Ponomaryov, I. Myachina, Anatoli Rudakov, Aleksandr Berda, Sergei Losev, Yevgeni Barkov, Yuri Dedovich, Yevgeni Dergachyov, Mikhail Devyatkin, Yefim Yoffe, Nikolai Makarov, Viktor Solovyov, A. Strepetov, Aleksei Vanin, Ye. Yerofeyev, O. Yudi, Yu. Zabludovsky

Crew
Director: Viktor Sadovsky
Writers: Valentin Ezhov, Natalya Gotovtseva, Pavel Kortobaj, Viktor Sadovsky
Cinematographer: Vadim Grammatikov
Composer: Vladlen Chistyakov
Editor: G. Baranova
Production designer: Vladimir Svetozarov

Production
Production companies: Lenfilm, Leninterfilm, Kraun (Belgium)
Production dates: 1990 - 1991
Filming locations: St. Petersburg, Russia, Moscow, Russia.
Additional production assistance was received from the Red Army and the Central Archives of the USSR.
Original period military uniforms of the Red Army were used in the film production.
Vintage Soviet cars of the 1940s and 1950s period were used in the film production.

Release
Theatrical release in Russia was in 1991
Theatrical release outside of Russia was in 1992
Video release was in 1993

Reception
Estimated theatrical viewership in the former Soviet Union was about 10 million.
International theatrical viewership - no data.

Facts of film production
The treatment for the film script was initially written by Valentin Ezhov in the 1980s, but he was waiting for the right time and circumstances together with director Viktor Sadovsky. The final script was written by the group of four authors.
Filmmakers changed the name of the main character to Bagrov, in order to avoid direct mentioning of the reputable Russian star Vsevolod Bobrov, whose popularity was high among sport fans in Russia, as well as internationally.
At the time of filming the former Soviet censorship was practically obsolete because of "perestroyka" and "glasnost" under Mikhail Gorbachev.
Absence of the Soviet censorship allowed to portray Stalin's son, Vasili Stalin, giving some artistic freedom to filmmakers, and also allowing Russian actresses to be involved in nudity and sex scenes, which were less than usual in the Soviet cinema before 1991.

Facts of history 
Vasili Stalin was the second and youngest son of Joseph Stalin.
In real life Vasili Iosifovich Stalin was imprisoned under a fictitious name "Vasili Vasilyev" in the Vladimir central prison. He was temporarily released under Nikita Khrushchev and returned to Moscow, but then was arrested again and exiled to the city of Kazan, where he died aged 42, in 1962. 
Vsevolod Bobrov excelled in both football (soccer) and ice hockey, and led the Soviet ice hockey team to victory in the 1956 Winter Olympic Games in Cortina d'Ampezzo, Italy, earning himself an Olympic Gold Medal.

External links 
Мой лучший друг генерал Василий, сын Иосифа на Kinoexpert.ru:  (Russian)
Мой лучший друг генерал Василий, сын Иосифа на Kinopoisk.ru:  (Russian)
 

1990s biographical drama films
Soviet biographical drama films
Russian biographical drama films
1990s sports comedy-drama films
1991 films
Soviet sports drama films
1990s Russian-language films
Films set in the 1940s
Films set in the 1950s
1991 comedy-drama films